Tonkinese may refer to:

 The language or people of Tonkin
 The Tonkinese cat breed